Sleepers West is a 1941 American mystery drama film directed by Eugene Forde and starring Lloyd Nolan, Lynn Bari and Mary Beth Hughes.

This second entry in 20th Century-Fox's Michael Shayne series was a remake of the 1934 Fox romantic drama Sleepers East from the novel Sleepers East (1933) by Frederick Nebel. The film Michael Shayne - Private Detective (1940) was the first in a series of 12 films. Lloyd Nolan starred as Shayne until the series was dropped by Twentieth Century-Fox and picked up by PRC. In the PRC series, Hugh Beaumont played Shayne.

Plot summary
On a fateful weekend, private detective Michael Shayne (Lloyd Nolan) secretly escorts murder-trial witness Helen Carlson (Mary Beth Hughes) by train from Denver to San Francisco. Helen's testimony will free a man falsely accused of murder. His acquittal will also effectively destroy the election chances of a crooked politician. By coincidence, Shayne is shadowed by his ex-fiancee, Denver newspaper reporter Kay Bentley (Lynn Bari). Furthermore, it so happens Kay is not just sniffing out a story. She is now engaged to marry Tom Linscott (Don Douglas), an associate of that above-mentioned politician. Thus, he accompanies Kay on the train ride to locate witness Helen Carlson—but for different reasons.

Eventually, Kay discovers Linscott's duplicitous, self-serving intentions and breaks her engagement. This clears the way for Kay and Shayne to unite in order to save Helen from harm. At one point, their train is involved in a wreck. This results in Kay, Shayne, Helen, and a runaway husband, Everett Jason (Louis Jean Heydt), taking a taxicab the rest of the way to Frisco. During a stopover at a farm, tension mounts between Kay and Shayne when the intrepid girl reporter phones in a story to her editor back in Denver. Shayne angrily reminds Kay that an innocent man's life is at stake, and any publicity of Helen's whereabouts might keep her from testifying.

The trial resumes the next morning in a San Francisco courtroom. At first, Helen Carlson is not there. However, she appears at the last second, just in the nick of time to present her life-saving testimony. Thanks to her, not to mention Michael Shayne and Kay Bentley, an innocent man is freed.

Cast
 Lloyd Nolan as Michael Shayne
 Lynn Bari as Kay Bentley
 Mary Beth Hughes as Helen Carlson
 Louis Jean Heydt as Everett Jason
 Edward Brophy as George Trautwein
 Don Costello as Carl Izzard
 Ben Carter as Leander Jones - Porter
 Don Douglas as Tom Linscott
 Oscar O'Shea as Engineer McGowan
 Harry Hayden as Conductor Lyons
 Hamilton MacFadden as Conductor Meyers
 Ferike Boros as Farm Lady

Production
The film was based on the novel Sleepers East which was published in 1933. The New York Times said "though lacking credibility as to plot, the story has full measure of action, suspense and emotional conflict." Film rights were bought by Fox and turned into a 1934 movie.

In October 1940 it was announced that the novel had been bought by Fox as a vehicle for Lyn Bari and would possibly co-star Dean Jagger. Lou Breslow would adapt the script, with filming to start in December. Eugene Ford was to direct.

Fox then announced that the film would be called Sleepers West instead of Sleepers East, and that the film would star Bari and Lloyd Nolan instead of Jagger. It was the third time that Nolan and Bari co-starred.

In November it was announced the film was being reconfigured as a Michael Shayne movie. It would be the second in the series, following Michael Shayne, Private Detective. Filming started 18 November 1940.

Reception
The Monthly Film Bulletin praised the "polished performances" of the leads, adding that "the direction is brisk, the dialogue amusing, and the settings aboard a train... are realistic." The Los Angeles Times called it "a lively brew".

The New York Times called it "singularly unexciting".

References

External links 
 
 
 
Sleepers West at Letterbox DVD
Sleepers West at BFI
 

1941 films
20th Century Fox films
1941 crime drama films
American black-and-white films
1940s English-language films
Films directed by Eugene Forde
Films based on American novels
American crime drama films
1940s American films